Matt Mitchell the defending champion of the Melbourne Indoor title lost in the second round to Broderick Dyke.  Dyke lost in the quarter finals to the eventual champion, Marty Davis, who beat Paul Annacone in the final, 6–4, 6–4

Seeds

  Paul Annacone (finalist)
  Ben Testerman (Semi-finalist)
  Matt Mitchell (second round)
  Brian Teacher (second round)
  Terry Moor (first round)
  Marty Davis (champion)
  Kelly Evernden (first round)
  Nduka Odizor (second round)

Draw

Finals

Top half

Bottom half

External links
 1985 Melbourne Indoor Singles draw

Melbourne Indoor Singles